Carhenge is a replica of England's Stonehenge located near the city of Alliance, Nebraska, in the High Plains region of the United States. Instead of being built with large standing stones, as is the case with the original Stonehenge, Carhenge is formed from vintage American automobiles, all covered with gray spray paint. Built by Jim Reinders, it was dedicated at the June 1987 summer solstice. In 2006, a visitor center was constructed to serve the site.

Structure

The heelstone is a 1962 Cadillac. Three cars were buried at Carhenge with a sign stating: "Here lie three bones of foreign cars. They served our purpose while Detroit slept. Now Detroit is awake and America's great!"

Carhenge replicates Stonehenge's current dilapidated state, rather than the original stone circle erected between 2500 BC and 2000 BC.

In addition to the Stonehenge replica, the Carhenge site includes several other artworks created from autos covered with various colors of spray paint.

History

Carhenge was conceived in 1987 by Jim Reinders as a memorial to his father. While living in England, he studied the structure of Stonehenge, which helped him to copy the structure’s shape, proportions, and size. Other automobile sculptures were subsequently added to the location of Carhenge, which is now known as the Car Art Reserve.

Reinders donated the 10-acre site to the Friends of Carhenge. In 2011 the Friends of Carhenge listed the attraction for sale for $300,000. In 2013 the Friends of Carhenge donated the site to the Citizens of Alliance.

Carhenge has appeared in film, popular music, television programs and commercials. It is the subject of the 2005 documentary Carhenge: Genius or Junk? and features in the 2007 travel book 1,000 Places to See in the USA and Canada Before You Die.

The path of totality of the solar eclipse of August 21, 2017 included Carhenge. An estimated 4,000 people, including Nebraska governor Pete Ricketts, viewed the eclipse from the site. Reinders stated that at the time of Carhenge's creation, he had not known about the eclipse that would occur 30 years later.

See also 
 Cadillac Ranch
 Spindle
 Stonehenge replicas and derivatives

References

External links 

 Official site
 , Nebraska State Historical Society
 

Outdoor sculptures in Nebraska
Roadside attractions in Nebraska
1987 sculptures
Buildings and structures in Box Butte County, Nebraska
Stonehenge replicas and derivatives
Tourist attractions in Box Butte County, Nebraska
1987 establishments in Nebraska